Ruben Vaughan (born August 5, 1956) is a former American football defensive tackle and defensive end. He played in the National Football League (NFL) for the San Francisco 49ers in 1979, the Los Angeles Raiders in 1982 and for the Minnesota Vikings in 1984.

References

1956 births
Living people
American football defensive ends
American football defensive tackles
BC Lions players
Colorado Buffaloes football players
Los Angeles Raiders players
Minnesota Vikings players
Oakland Invaders players
Players of American football from Los Angeles
San Francisco 49ers players
Players of Canadian football from Los Angeles